Voetbalvereniging Staphorst is a football club from Staphorst, Netherlands. VV Staphorst plays in the 2022-23 Vierde Divisie.

History
VV Staphorst was founded on 30 November 1959.

In the National 2011–12 KNVB Cup Staphorst won first round 4–2 against RKSV Groene Ster. In the second round it played in Het Noorderslag against VV Montfoort in the second round. Montfoort player Joost van Apeldoorn was sent out with a red card in minute 59. With one more player on the field, Staphorst scored twice and went on to the third round. In the third round it lost 2–4 against Sparta Nijkerk.

References

External links
 Official site

Football clubs in the Netherlands
Association football clubs established in 1959
1959 establishments in the Netherlands
Football clubs in Overijssel
Staphorst